Bolsa or Pelota may refer to

Bolsa de Valores (disambiguation), a stock exchange in Spanish and Portuguese speaking countries
Bank of London and South America
La Bolsa, a town in Uruguay
Juan Bolsa, a character in the US TV series Breaking Bad

See also 
Bolsa Familia, a government grant in Brazil
Palacio da Bolsa, Porto, Portugal